Longstreet Inn, Casino and RV Resort is located on State Route 373, in Amargosa Valley, Nevada, seven miles north of Death Valley Junction. The resort has a nine-hole golf course, 60 rooms, an RV park with 50 spaces, as well as a casino, a bar and two restaurants.

Notes

External links
 Longstreet Hotel & Casino website

Buildings and structures in Nye County, Nevada
Casino hotels
Casinos in Nevada
Hotels in Nevada
Tourist attractions in Nye County, Nevada